The Mount Pleasant Elementary School District operates five pre-high schools in San Jose, California, USA. The district has 143 teachers (FTEs) serving 2849 students.

Note: Based on 2002–2003 school year data

References

External links
 

School districts in San Jose, California